Sheikhupur railway station is a main railway station in Badaun district, Uttar Pradesh. Its code is SKW. It serves Sheikhupur city. The station consists of two platforms. The platforms are not well sheltered. It lacks many facilities including water and sanitation.

Trains are available for Bareilly, Ramnagar, Agra, Mumbai, Vadodara, Surat, Mathura, Kota etc.

Trains

References

Railway stations in Budaun district
Izzatnagar railway division